Culama alpina is a moth in the family Cossidae. It was described by Kallies and D.J. Hilton in 2012. It is found in Australia, where it has been recorded from Tasmania, Victoria, New South Wales and the Australian Capital Territory. The habitat consists of alpine heath and snow gum woodlands.

The ground colour of the forewings is grey with a brownish hue and with transverse black lines and streaks. The hindwings are dark fuscous. Adults have been recorded on wing from December to mid-February.

The larvae possibly feed on Eucalyptus pauciflora.

Etymology
The species name is derived from alpina (meaning of the alps or mountains).

References

Natural History Museum Lepidoptera generic names catalog

Cossinae
Moths described in 2012
Endemic fauna of Australia
Moths of Australia